Jahada  is a village development committee in the Nawalparasi District in the Lumbini Zone of southern Nepal. At the time of the 1991 Nepal census it had a population of 6532 people living in 1110 individual households. It has 9 wards. The village development committee office is located in Vatulliya beside the Jahada community library.

References

Populated places in Parasi District